Dambdaf-e Osman (also Romanized as Dambdaf-e ʿOs̄mān) is a village in Kambel-e Soleyman Rural District, in the Central District of Chabahar County, Sistan and Baluchestan Province, Iran. At the 2006 census, its population was 250, in 43 families.

References 

Populated places in Chabahar County